Biddy White Lennon (5 September 1946 – 25 November 2017) was an Irish actress and food writer.

Life
White Lennon was born in Dublin and began acting when she was four. Her mother was Ursula White, a drama professor who ran a school of acting in the Pocket Theatre at Ely Place (one of her students was Joe Dowling while Deirdre O'Connell used the school as her foundation for the Stanislavski Studio). Her father died while she was under ten. 

White Lennon started in The Riordans when the programme first aired in January 1965. She played the role of Maggie Riordan (née Nael), daughter-in-law of the matriarch and wife of Benjy, and she remained on the show until its cancellation in 1979. When the series was brought to the radio, White Lennon wrote for it. She later appeared as a judge on TV3's The Great Irish Bake Off.

After her appearance on The Riordans, White Lennon went on to become well regarded in the culinary world and became founder member and Chairwoman of the Irish Food Writers Guild. White Lennon was also editor of the Irish Home Diary and food writer for both the Irish Home Diary and to Food and Wine Magazine.

In her later years, White Lennon lived in County Wexford with her husband Denis Latimer, who died in December 2016. They had one son, Dairsie.

Books
 Wild Food
 The Very Best of Traditional Irish Cooking
 Best of Irish Home Baking
 Irish Cooking
 Best of Irish Potato Recipes
 A Taste of Ireland
 Best of Irish Traditional Cooking
 Best of Irish Festive Cooking
 Irish Food & Cooking
 The Irish Heritage Cookbook
 Classic Recipes of Ireland
 The Irish Kitchen
 Best of Irish Meat Recipes
 Traditional Cooking of Ireland
 The Irish Kitchen
 Eating at Home Cook Book
 Poolbeg Book of Traditional Irish Cooking
 Leaving Home Cook Book
 The Irish Heritage Cookbook

References

External links
 
 

1946 births
2017 deaths
Irish film actresses
Irish soap opera actresses
Irish television actresses
Irish women writers
People from County Wexford
Actresses from Dublin (city)